Richard M. Bracken (born 1952/53) is an American businessman. He was the chairman and chief executive officer (CEO) of the Hospital Corporation of America, the largest for-profit healthcare provider in the world, from January 2009 to December 2013.

Early life
Richard M. Bracken graduated from San Diego State University in 1974 and a Master of Health Administration from the Medical College of Virginia in 1977.

Career
Bracken joined the Hospital Corporation of America in 1981. He became its president and chief operating officer in 2002. Since 2009, he has served as chief executive officer as well as chairman, replacing Jack O. Bovender, Jr. In 2013, he earned $38.6 million for his role as CEO, making him the second highest paid CEO in the United States, after the Oracle Corporation's Larry Ellison and before The Walt Disney Company's Bob Iger. He stepped down as CEO on December 31, 2013, but remains a member of the board of directors.

Bracken has served on the boards of directors of the California Hospital Association, the Federation of American Hospitals, and the United Way of Metropolitan Nashville. Additionally, he is a member of the American Society of Corporate Executives, The Business Council, the Nashville Healthcare Council, the Community Foundation of Middle Tennessee Board. He is also a Fellow in the American College of Healthcare Executives.

Personal life
Bracken has a wife, Judith, and four children. They reside in Nashville, Tennessee.

References

Living people
HCA Healthcare people
People from Nashville, Tennessee
San Diego State University alumni
Medical College of Virginia alumni
American health care chief executives
1950s births